Robert Prigent (24 November 1910 - 13 July 1995) was a French politician. He served as a member of the National Assembly from 1945 to 1951 for the Mouvement républicain populaire, representing Nord. He was also the Minister of Population and Public Health from 1945 to 1947.

References

1910 births
1995 deaths
People from Saint-Pol-sur-Mer
French Roman Catholics
Politicians from Hauts-de-France
Popular Democratic Party (France) politicians
Popular Republican Movement politicians
French Ministers of Health
Members of the Constituent Assembly of France (1945)
Members of the Constituent Assembly of France (1946)
Deputies of the 1st National Assembly of the French Fourth Republic
French Confederation of Christian Workers members